Emil Orgetorix Gustav Forrer (also Emilio O. Forrer; ; 19 February 1894, Straßburg, Alsace-Lorraine – 10 January 1986, San Salvador) was a Swiss Assyriologist and pioneering Hittitologist.

Moreover, Emil Forrer developed a deviant interdisciplinary field of research (Meropisforschung), based on textual fragments of the Greek historian Theopompus of Chios, and dealing with assumed pre- or protohistoric contacts between the Old- and the New World. Antithetic to the prevailing academic school of thought, Forrer advocated the idea that Theopomp's "Meropis" was not a fictional place but an actual geographic entity.

Works
 Forrer, E. Neue Probleme zum Ursprung der indogermanichen Sprachen. “Mannus”, B. 26, 1934
 Forrer, E. Homerisch und silenisch Amerika, San Salvador (author's edition) 1975

See also
 Meropis
 Historicity of the Iliad
 Wilusa

References

Linguists from Switzerland
1894 births
1986 deaths
20th-century linguists